Desire in Motion is a French-Canadian drama film, directed by Lea Pool and released in 1994.

Inspired by texts such as Roland Barthes' A Lover's Discourse: Fragments, Francesco Alberoni's Falling in Love and the autobiography of Carl Jung, the film stars Jean-François Pichette and Valérie Kaprisky as Vincent and Catherine, a man and woman falling in love as they meet and get acquainted on a train trip to Vancouver.

The film premiered at the Rendez-vous du cinéma québécois on February 3, 1994.

Awards
The film received eight Genie Award nominations at the 15th Genie Awards: Best Actress (Kaprisky), Best Director (Pool), Best Original Screenplay (Pool), Best Art Direction/Production Design (Serge Bureau), Best Costume Design (Sabina Haag), Best Editing (Michel Arcand), Best Overall Sound (Hans Künzi, François Musy, Florian Eidenbenz and Jo Caron) and Best Sound Editing (Jacques Plante, Antoine Morin, Jérôme Décarie and Michel Arcand).

References

External links 
 

Films directed by Léa Pool
Canadian drama films
1994 films
French-language Canadian films
1990s Canadian films